The women's high jump at the 2022 World Athletics Championships was held at the Hayward Field in Eugene on 16 and 19 July 2022.

Summary

All twelve finalists cleared 1.89m, ten over 1.93m and eight over 1.96m.  Iryna Herashchenko, Yaroslava Mahuchikh, Elena Vallortigara and Eleanor Patterson all made 1.98m.  Patterson took three attempts to make her clearance while Mahuchikh and Vallortigara were tied for the lead with perfect rounds going.  At 2 metres, Vallortigara remained perfect, while the other three made it on their second attempts.  At , Mahuchikh and Herashchenko missed, then Patterson soared over on her first attempt to tie her National and continental record. When Vallortigara also missed, Patterson had completed a move from fourth place off the podium, to first place.  Mahuchikh made it on her second attempt, while the others couldn't get over the bar.  With extended time limits, neither Mahuchikh or Patterson could make 2.04m. Patterson was confirmed at the gold medalist, Mahuchikh silver and Vallortigara bronze.

Records
Before the competition records were as follows:

Qualification standard
The standard to qualify automatically for entry was 1.96 m.

Schedule
The event schedule, in local time (UTC−7), was as follows:

Results

Qualification 

Qualification: 1.95 m (Q) or at least 12 best performers (q).

Final 
The final took place on 19 July at 17:40.

References

High jump
High jump at the World Athletics Championships